San Javier Airport,  is an airport serving San Javier, a town in the Maule Region of Chile.

See also

Transport in Chile
List of airports in Chile

References

External links
OpenStreetMap - San Javier
OurAirports - San Javier
SkyVector - San Javier
WorldAirportCodes - San Javier, Chile

Airports in Chile
Airports in Maule Region